The Melbourne Rugby League, (currently the Storm Premiership for branding reasons), is a rugby league football competition located in Melbourne, Victoria, Australia and run by NRL Victoria. As of the 2022 season, there are currently 17 competing teams across the varying age groups who are affiliated with the Melbourne Storm junior system.

Clubs

Melbourne Rugby League Clubs

Defunct Clubs

Mens First Grade Premiers
Since the commencement of the competition in 1952, the St Kilda Saints RLC have won the most premierships (10) over all, however, of the current clubs, the most premierships have been won by Altona Roosters (8).

Women's First Grade Premiers
The NRL Victoria women's first grade competition has been run since 2015. The most premierships have been won by Werribee Bears (2).

Notable Juniors
Altona Roosters
 Jeremy Smith
 Gareth Widdop
 Drury Low
 Charnze Nicoll-Klokstad
 Ben Nakubuwai
 Jamayne Taunoa-Brown

North West Wolves
 Greg Marzhew

South Eastern Titans
 Mahe Fonua
 Francis Tualau
 Kenny Bromwich
Northern Thunder
 Young Tonumaipea
 Richard Kennar 
Waverley Oakleigh Panthers
 Drury Low
 Denny Solomona

Sunbury Tigers
 Dean Ieremia
 Fonua Pole

Casey Warriors
 Connor Donehue
 Kelma Tuilagi

See also

Rugby league in Victoria

References

External links
The Victorian Rugby League

Rugby league competitions in Australia
Rugby league in Victoria (Australia)
Sports competitions in Melbourne